Uncial 0219 (in the Gregory-Aland numbering), is a Greek uncial manuscript of the New Testament, dated paleographically to the 4th century (or 5th). The codex contains a small parts of the Epistle to the Romans (2:21-23; 3:8-9,23-25,27-30), on 2 parchment leaves (20 cm by 14 cm). It is written in two columns per page, 26 lines per page.

The Greek text of this codex is mixed. Aland placed it in Category III.

Currently it is dated by the INTF to the 4th or 5th century. It was found in Fayum.

The manuscript was added to the list of the New Testament manuscripts by Kurt Aland in 1953. It was examined by Peter Sanz (1946), Kurt Treu (1976), Pasquale Orsini (2005), and Stanley E. Porter (2008).

The codex is located at the Austrian National Library, in Vienna, with the shelf number Pap. G. 36113, 26083.

See also 

 List of New Testament uncials
 Textual criticism

References

Further reading 

 
 

Greek New Testament uncials
5th-century biblical manuscripts
Biblical manuscripts of the Austrian National Library